Shahverdi Khan (fl. 17th-century) was a Safavid official of Georgian origin, who served as a governor (vali) of the Lorestan province during the reign of king Suleiman I (r. 1666–1694). Prior to his appointment, the Lorestan rulers were appointed from local chiefs. In 1674, the people of the province revolted against him.

References

Sources
 
 

17th-century births
History of Lorestan Province
Safavid governors of Lorestan
Iranian people of Georgian descent
17th-century people of Safavid Iran
Year of death unknown